Liga Indonesia Second Division (Indonesian: Divisi Dua Liga Indonesia) is the fourth level football league in the Indonesian football competition system. Currently, this competition, along with First Division and Third Division, is managed by the Amateur League Board of the Football Association of Indonesia (PSSI).

This level of Indonesian football is amateur and is run on a national level. This competition is for players under the age of twenty-three years and is part of the youth player development program.

After the establishment of the Liga Nusantara in 2014, the Second Division will be dissolved.

Previous winners

1995-2008 (third-tier)
1995 - Persikabo Bogor
1996 - Persikota Tangerang
1997 - Persipal Palu
1998 - not held due to cancellation of Divisi Utama
1999 - PS Palembang
2000 - Persik Kediri
2001 - Persela Lamongan
2002-03 - Persid Jember
2003 - Persekabpas Pasuruan
2004 - Persibo Bojonegoro
2005 - Persiku Kudus
2006 - PSIR Rembang
2007 - Persires Rengat

2008-2013 (fourth-tier)
2008: PS Barito Putera
2009–10: Persikasi Bekasi
2010–11: Persebangga Purbalingga
2012: Nusa Ina FC (LPIS), Persinab Nabire (BLAI)
2013: Cilegon United

References

   
4
4
Sports leagues established in 1994